"Breaking and Entering" is a 1980 dance single by Dee Dee Sharp-Gamble.  

The single was her first to chart on Billboard's Dance Play chart and marked  a return the music charts by Sharp, who had not charted any singles in six years. "Breaking and Entering", along "Easy Money" hit No. 1 on the dance charts for four weeks in the spring of 1981. Although Sharp promoted the single on American Bandstand, it failed to reach either the R&B or pop chart.

References

1980 singles
1980 songs
Song articles with missing songwriters